Saint-Vincent-de-Lamontjoie (literally Saint-Vincent of Lamontjoie; Gascon: Sent Vincenç de la Montjòia) is a commune in the Lot-et-Garonne department in south-western France.

See also
Communes of the Lot-et-Garonne department

References

Saintvincentdelamontjoie